Alipura is a town in Nowgong tehsil, Chhatarpur district, Sagar division of Madhya Pradesh, India. The language of the local population is Hindi.

History

Formerly this town was the capital of the princely state of Alipura in Central India, which was under the Bundelkhand Agency. The state had a population of 15,316 in 1931. The principality of Alipura was founded in 1757 by Hundupat Aman Singh, Raja of Panna State by granting the lands surrounding the town to Achal Singh, son of Mukund Singh, who was the sardar of Panna at that time.

The palace of the former princely rulers of Alipura is now a heritage hotel run by a direct descendant of the ruling family.

References

External links

Indiamapia, Alipura

 
Former capital cities in India